The Dyrhólaey Lighthouse is a lighthouse located on the central south coast of Iceland.

Description 
The lighthouse consists of a square concrete tower, painted white with red trim. Integral keepers quarters are placed on the left and right sides of the tower. A red metal lantern house is placed on top of the tower. The site (but not the tower) is open to visitors.

History 
The light station at Dyrhólaey was established in 1910.  The first lighthouse was a skeletal steel tower prefabricated in Sweden.  The present lighthouse was built in 1927.

Characteristic 
The light flashes white every 10 seconds. It marks the southernmost point of the mainland of Iceland.

See also 

 List of lighthouses in Iceland

References

External links 

 

Lighthouses completed in 1927
Lighthouses in Iceland